The 1978–79 Indiana State Sycamores men's basketball team is considered the greatest in the school's history. The Sycamores competed as members of the Missouri Valley Conference during the 1978–79 NCAA Division I men's basketball season, playing their home games at the Hulman Center in Terre Haute, Indiana. Led by first-year head coach Bill Hodges and National Player of the Year Larry Bird, Indiana State was unranked to begin the season, but swept through the regular season unbeaten. Bird led the #1 ranked Sycamores to the national title game versus the Magic Johnson-led #3 Michigan State Spartans, and ended the season as National runner-up with a record of 33–1 (16–0 MVC). To date, the 1978–79 Sycamores are the only team to advance this far in their first-ever NCAA appearance. They had been the last unbeaten team to reach the national title game until Gonzaga in 2021.

Roster
The Sycamores were led by Bird, the NCAA Player of the Year, and his 28.6 scoring average. He was followed by Carl Nicks’ 19.3 average. The starting lineup also included Miley, Alex Gilbert and Steve Reed. Heaton and Leroy Staley were key reserves. The remainder of the roster consisted of Tom Crowder, Eric Curry, Rod McNelly, Rich Nemcek, Bob Ritter and Scott Turner.

Season summary
In 1979, the NCAA tournament championship game was the most-watched game in the history of the sport, in no small part because of Indiana State star Larry Bird. Bird wasn’t a one-man show, but the unheralded Sycamores rode him to a 33–0 record heading into the title game. The well-rounded Bird averaged 29 points, 14.8 rebounds, and, most significantly, six assists as he changed the way the game was played.

Offseason
Head coach Bob King suffered a stroke and was unable to continue as head coach of the Sycamores. Assistant Bill Hodges was elevated to the position of head coach.

Exhibition vs. Soviet National Team
On November 20, the touring Soviet National team came to Hulman Center to play Indiana State. ISU defeated the Soviets, 83–79, to become one of only four college teams to beat them that season.

Regular season
During the 1978–79 season, Indiana State qualified for the NCAA tournament. ISU finished the regular season 29–0, 16–0 in the Missouri Valley Conference, and earned the top ranking in the country.

The only time that the perfect regular season was in jeopardy was on Feb. 1. The Sycamores were 18–0 against New Mexico State. With three seconds remaining, the Sycamores were down 83–81. New Mexico State was at the free throw line and the shot was missed. The missed shot was rebounded by Brad Miley and passed to Bob Heaton. Heaton launched a 50-foot desperation shot which banked through the net to send the game into overtime.

Bird received several honors at the end of regular season. He won the USBWA College Player of the Year, Naismith and Wooden Awards, given to the year's top male college basketball player.

Schedule and results

|-
!colspan=9 style=| Exhibition

|-
!colspan=9 style=| Regular season

|-
!colspan=9 style= | Missouri Valley Conference tournament

|-
!colspan=9 style= | NCAA Tournament

Source: Schedule

NCAA basketball tournament

The top seed in the NCAA Midwest Regional was awarded to the Sycamores. The final game of the regional tournament was against Arkansas with a berth in the Final Four on the line. With the game tied at 71, the right-handed Heaton was the hero again with a last second left-handed shot in the lane to win the game. They advanced to the championship game and faced Michigan State University, which was led by sophomore Magic Johnson. In what was the most-watched college basketball game ever, Michigan State defeated Indiana State 75–64, and Johnson was voted Most Outstanding Player of the Final Four.

West
Indiana State (#1 seed) 86, Virginia Tech (#8 seed) 69
Indiana State 93, Oklahoma (#5 seed) 72
Indiana State 73, Arkansas (#2 seed) 71

Final Four
Indiana State 76, DePaul 74
Michigan State 75, Indiana State 64

Rankings

^Coaches did not release Week 1 or Week 2 polls.

Awards and honors
Larry Bird, Consensus All-American teams
Larry Bird, All-Missouri Valley Conference
Larry Bird – AP, UPI, USBWA, The Sporting News, Basketball Weekly All-American selections
Larry Bird, Missouri Valley Conference Most Valuable Player
Larry Bird – 1979 Oscar Robertson Trophy, Naismith Award, John R. Wooden Award, Adolph Rupp Trophy, AP Player of the Year, Eastman Award
Bill Hodges, NCAA Coach of the Year

References

Indiana State Sycamores men's basketball seasons
Indiana State
Indiana State
NCAA Division I men's basketball tournament Final Four seasons
Indiana State Sycamores men's basketball
Indiana State Sycamores men's basketball